Robert Bazil Krupansky (August 15, 1921 – November 8, 2004) was a United States circuit judge of the United States Court of Appeals for the Sixth Circuit and a United States district judge of the United States District Court for the Northern District of Ohio.

Education and career

Born in Cleveland, Ohio, Krupansky was in the United States Army Air Froces from 1942 to 1946. He received a Bachelor of Arts degree from Case Western Reserve University in 1946, and a Bachelor of Laws from Case Western Reserve University School of Law in 1948. He was a United States Air Force Reserve Colonel from 1946 to 1972. He was in private practice in Cleveland from 1948 to 1951. He was an assistant state attorney general of Ohio from 1951 to 1957. He was the Director of the Ohio Department of Liquor Control from 1957 to 1958. He was a judge on the Court of Common Pleas, Cuyahoga County, Ohio from 1958 to 1959. He was in private practice in Cleveland from 1960 to 1969. He was a legal consultant for the City of Mayfield Heights, Ohio from 1960 to 1964. He was a special counsel to the state attorney general of Ohio from 1964 to 1968. He was the United States Attorney for the Northern District of Ohio from 1969 to 1970. His First Assistant attorney was Robert Jones and additional details of Krupansky's work as U.S. Attorney may be found at  Robert Walter Jones JD Library and Archive.

Federal judicial service

Krupansky was nominated by President Richard Nixon on October 7, 1970, to the United States District Court for the Northern District of Ohio, to a new seat created by 84 Stat. 294. He was confirmed by the United States Senate on October 13, 1970, and received his commission on October 16, 1970. Krupansky served in that capacity until March 19, 1982, due to elevation to the Sixth Circuit.

Krupansky was nominated by President Ronald Reagan on January 28, 1982, to a seat on the United States Court of Appeals for the Sixth Circuit vacated by Judge Paul Charles Weick. He was confirmed by the Senate on March 4, 1982, and received his commission on March 10, 1982. He assumed senior status on July 1, 1991. Krupansky served in that capacity until his death on November 8, 2004, in Cleveland.

Krupansky's sister, Blanche Krupansky, was a justice of the Ohio Supreme Court.

References

Sources
 

1921 births
2004 deaths
Case Western Reserve University alumni
Judges of the United States District Court for the Northern District of Ohio
United States district court judges appointed by Richard Nixon
Judges of the United States Court of Appeals for the Sixth Circuit
United States court of appeals judges appointed by Ronald Reagan
20th-century American judges
United States Army officers
United States Attorneys for the Northern District of Ohio
Lawyers from Cleveland
United States Army Air Forces personnel of World War II